Kaloi Limenes or Kali Limenes is a village and port in the Heraklion regional unit, southern Crete, in Greece, located 70km (43.5 miles) south-west of the city of Heraklion.  It has 21 inhabitants (2011). It is known as a major bunkering spot for ships in the southern Mediterranean.

History
Kaloi Limenes (meaning 'good harbors' or 'fair havens') is a natural port near the southernmost point of Crete. It is close to the village of Lentas (ancient Levin), and the unexcavated remains of Lassea, a port for the ancient settlement of Gortys.

According to the Acts of the Apostles, Apostle Paul, landed at Kaloi Limenes on his way from Caesarea to Rome as a prisoner of the Romans, then proceeded further west along the coast to Phoinikas ("Phoenix"), identified to the homonym small village in the bay west of Loutro or Loutro itself. A small church was built there (first in Byzantine times, then restored in the 1960s).

Bunkering

The port is the home of a major oil storage and terminal facility, located on the small island of Aghios Pavlos ("Saint Paul") at the port's entrance. The facility has four shore-based storage tanks containing fuel oil and gasoil, pumps of 1,000 cubic metres per hour capacity and three loading docks. The terminal's maximum draft of 40 feet (13.45 metres) enables the facility to handle oil tankers of up to approximately two hundred thousand metric tons of deadweight.

Exact location

See also 
 Matala, Crete
 Libyan Sea
 Historical reliability of the Acts of the Apostles

Notes 

Populated places in Heraklion (regional unit)
Oil terminals
Mediterranean port cities and towns in Greece